Chaparral High School is a public high school in Clark County School District located in Las Vegas, Nevada. It is located in the east side of the valley. The school was established in the fall of 1973. Its mascot is Kevin the Cowboy and its school colors are orange, black, and white. The school fight song is the theme from the classic western The Magnificent Seven composed by Elmer Bernstein.

Chaparral's mission statement is "Creatively meeting the challenges of a changing world through Courage Harmony Ambition Pride"

History 
The school opened in 1973. The two story campus was designed by Caudill, Rowlett, Scott & Jack Miller & Associates. Construction started in September 1971, and was undertaken by Del E. Webb Corporation.

Extracurricular activities 
Chaparral High School is home to a variety of clubs and organizations, including choir, band, orchestra, dance, cheer leading, theatre and also includes a Navy JROTC unit.

NJROTC 
The NJROTC program also has one of the best color guards in CCSD, and their RTO (individual rifle exhibition) performers are always competitive.  The Armed and Unarmed Drill Teams are rebuilding, with many first year cadets on the teams.  Next year is very promising with most of both teams returning.  The marksmanship team has had great success over the past eight years, making steady progress to becoming one of the top teams in Area 13.  They captured the 2013-2014 CCSD Air Rifle Championship. The cadets earned the Unit Achievement Award for the 2013/2014 school year.

Athletics 
Chaparral's athletics program is known as the Cowboys and competes in the Sunset 1A Region.  The Cowboys have a prominent rivalry with Eldorado in football The Battle for Merlin Olsen's Cleat. which began in 1973.   Chaparral won the 2008 game, defeating Eldorado 17 to 14. The Cowboys hold a substantial lead in the series 28-14. Chaparral has won 10 of the last 17 meetings; although there was a record four-game losing streak in the early-2000s. In the fall of 2012 Chaparral football team took back the Cleat in a 52-14 victory.
Also in the fall of 2013 Chaparral kept the cleat only to lose it to Eldo in 2014.

The 2007-2008 year the cheerleaders went to camp and brought back 9 trophies (8 First place, 1 Second), 2008-2009 year they brought back six trophies. Also in the 2014-15? school year they brought home 3 trophies.

2012-2013 
In 2012-2013 school year Chaparral had great success with their sports program. The men's and women's soccer team went to their first playoff game in over 8 years. The men's and women's basketball team went to the second round of the state playoffs, along with men's tennis team. Chaparral's women's volleyball team made their first appearance in the state playoffs in over 18 years. Only to come up one game short of a state title. Chaparral's baseball team had an unforgettable season ending with a record of (22-9). The baseball team had a record of (9-33) their past two seasons combine. After falling to Boulder City and Moapa valley in the semi-finals of the state playoff tournament. On the other side of the field, Softball welcomes their first state game in over 26 years. Although in 2014 season Chaparral won't have the same starters  head coach, Coach Coleman looks forward to rebuilding his dream team once again. The men's volleyball team made their first state playoff run since 2004. Rebounding from an 8-25 record within 2 years to a 9-4 record in a single season was a huge accomplishment. Only to come up short in the second round of the state playoffs. After Losing four seniors, the cowboy's have more than enough talent to get the job done. With 5 out of 7 starters returning and help from a strong bench there's no doubt in mind that they will make another playoff run.

2013-2014
Chaparral's athletic programs look to be promising. After losing majority of their football team to graduation, the cowboys look forward to rebuild for the upcoming years. The Cowboys ended their season with a 4-5 record finishing 4th in their division. Meanwhile, inside the gym the women's volleyball team went for another playoff run. Under new head coach, Coach Cloud the lady cowboy's went 13-10 overall.
After a previous record of 22-5 the women's volleyball team now face new challenges when the remaining seniors leave.
The cowboy's baseball went the distances behind the Crone brother's. Just a year ago the baseball team had ended a playoff drought, after sweeping threw their division the Cowboys wanted a state title.
With the title so close in their reach the Faith Lutheran High School pulled out a 14-0 victory. Sending the Cowboys home after a long season.

2014-2015
Chaparral continues to make steady progress as a title I school, providing a comprehensive education to its students.

The Turnaround Principal David Wilson got promoted to Assistant Chief Student Achievement Officer over the Rural Schools in the District

Nevada Interscholastic Activities Association State Championships 
 Baseball - 1980, 1991
 Cross Country (Boys) - 1978
 Football - 1977, 
 Soccer (Boys) - 1993, 2001 
 Soccer (Girls) - 2001,2002,2004
 Volleyball (Girls) - 1982, 1984, 1994
 Wrestling - 1976, 1977, 1978, 1983
 Golf - (Boys) 1987, 2010
 Men's Volleyball -1992, 1993, 1994, 1995, 2001
 Men's Track and Field (boys)-1993-1994.  Won on the same day as the boys Volleyball team in 1900
 
 Tennis (boys)-1990, 1991, 1993
 Softball - 1983
 Tennis -2014

Notable alumni 

Dustin Lee Abraham - writer and producer (How High, CSI: Crime Scene Investigation) 
Mark Slaughter ('81) - musician (Slaughter)
Pace Mannion (76) -NBA Basketball Player 
Ginger Fish ('83) - musician (Marilyn Manson, Rob Zombie)
Sean "Hollywood" Hamilton (Freshman only) - National Radio Personality
Mark Menendo ('85 ) - Nevada State Senator
Anthony E. Zuiker ('86) - writer and executive producer (CSI: Crime Scene Investigation, CSI: Miami, CSI: NY), new school theatre is named after him 
Joey Slotnick ('86) - television and film actor
Cast of High School Reunion TV Series ('89)
Greg Martinez ('90) - Former MLB player (Milwaukee Brewers)
Jennifer Cole Dorsey ('90) - United States district judge of the United States District Court for the District of Nevada.
Mark Stoermer ('95) - musician (The Killers)
Richard Seigler ('99) - football player and coach
Brandon Flowers ('99) - musician (The Killers) 
Brandyn Dombrowski ('99-2002) - NFL Left Tackle for San Diego Chargers
Will Hernandez ('13) - NFL Offensive Linesman for the New York Giants. The New York Giants selected Hernandez in the second round (34th overall) of the 2018 NFL Draft. Hernandez was the second guard drafted in 2018.
On May 12, 2018, the New York Giants signed Hernandez to a four-year, $7.45 million contract that includes $5.08 million guaranteed and a signing bonus of $3.49 million.

References

External links 
 Chaparral High School
 The Alumni Association for Chaparral
  Old Alumni Page
  Chaparral Photography
  Chaparral Band Program

Clark County School District
School buildings completed in 1973
Educational institutions established in 1973
Buildings and structures in Paradise, Nevada
1973 establishments in Nevada